The following is the list of French Ligue 1 top scorers by season, since the inception of the French First Division in 1932 until the present day. Josip Skoblar holds the record for most goals in a single season at 44. Carlos Bianchi, Delio Onnis and Jean-Pierre Papin share the record for most awards won, with five wins each. The latest top scorer of Ligue 1 is Kylian Mbappé of Paris Saint-Germain, who scored 28 goals in the 2021–22 season.

All-time top scorers

Key
 Bold shows players still playing in Ligue 1.
 Italics show players still playing professional football in other leagues.

Top scorers by season

See also
Capocannoniere
Premier League Golden Boot
List of Bundesliga top scorers by season
List of La Liga top scorers
European Golden Shoe
List of top international men's football goal scorers by country

References

     
France
France
Association football player non-biographical articles